Queen of Beggars is an Iranian Drama Series directed by Hossein Soheili Zadeh.

Storyline 
Alborz Shams (Arman Darvish), a resident of Germany, returns to Iran for the death of his father, but in Iran everyone calls him Farhad Babaei and no one remembers him, not even his love Sara (Shabnam Ghorbani).

Cast 
 Baran Kosari
 Arman Darvish
 Farzad Farzin
 Mohammad Reza Ghaffari
 Pantea Bahram
 Roya Nonahali
 Reza Behboodi
 Erfan Naseri
 Shabnam Ghorbani
 Yasna Mirtahmasb
 Ali Salahi
 Elham Korda
 Solmaz Ghani
 Ali Oji
 Behshad Sharifian
 Noora Mohaghegh
 Maryam Sarmadi
 Sheyda Yousefi
 Arash Dehghan

References 

Malake Gedayan, imna

External links
 
 Queen of Beggars at Filimo
  Queen of Beggars  Official website

2020s Iranian television series
Iranian television series